Nokomis Township (T10N R2W) is located in Montgomery County, Illinois, United States. As of the 2010 census, its population was 2,939 and it contained 1,386 housing units.

Geography

Demographics

Adjacent townships
 Greenwood Township, Christian County (north)
 Rosamond Township, Christian County (northeast)
 Audubon Township (east & southeast)
 Witt Township (south)
 Irving Township (southwest)
 Rountree Township (west)
 Ricks Township, Christian County (northwest)

References

External links
City-data.com
Illinois State Archives
Historical Society of Montgomery County

Townships in Montgomery County, Illinois
1872 establishments in Illinois
Townships in Illinois